Rodrigo Rivas Gonzalez (born 11 April 1997) is a Colombian footballer currently playing as a forward for Ecuadorian club Orense .

Career statistics

Club

Notes

References

1997 births
Living people
Sportspeople from Chocó Department
Colombian footballers
Association football forwards
Cypriot First Division players
Doxa Katokopias FC players
Anagennisi Deryneia FC players
Croatian Football League players
NK Rudeš players
Segunda División B players
Tercera División players
Deportivo Alavés B players
Amurrio Club footballers
CD Marino players
Colombian expatriate footballers
Colombian expatriate sportspeople in Cyprus
Colombian expatriate sportspeople in Croatia
Colombian expatriate sportspeople in Spain
Expatriate footballers in Cyprus
Expatriate footballers in Croatia
Expatriate footballers in Spain